Charlotte Bernard (born 1 June 1972) is a French snowboarder. She competed in women's giant slalom at the 1998 Winter Olympics in Nagano.

References

External links

1972 births
Living people
French female snowboarders
Olympic snowboarders of France
Snowboarders at the 1998 Winter Olympics
20th-century French women